The 1926 Dayton Flyers football team was an American football team that represented the University of Dayton as a member of the Ohio Athletic Conference during the 1926 college football season. In its fourth season under head coach Harry Baujan, the team compiled an 8–2 record.

Schedule

References

Dayton
Dayton Flyers football seasons
Dayton Flyers football